Bothroponera tesseronoda, is a species of ant of the subfamily Ponerinae, which can be found from India, and Sri Lanka.

References

External links

 at antwiki.org
Animaldiversity.org
Itis.org
Asian myrmecology

Ponerinae
Hymenoptera of Asia
Insects described in 1877